Namsan Station may refer to:

Namsan Station (Busan)
Namsan Station (Kangwon Line)
Namsan Station (Gimcheon)
Namsan Station (Daegu)